Bang on a Can is a multi-faceted contemporary classical music organization based in New York City. It was founded in 1987 by three American composers who remain its artistic directors: Julia Wolfe, David Lang, and Michael Gordon. Called "the country's most important vehicle for contemporary music" by the San Francisco Chronicle, the organization focuses on the presentation of new concert music, and has presented hundreds of musical events worldwide.

Notable performances
Bang on a Can is perhaps best known for its Marathon Concerts, during which an eclectic mix of pieces are performed in succession over the course of many hours while audience members, who are encouraged to maintain a "jeans-and-tee-shirt informality," are welcome to come and go as they please.  For the twentieth anniversary of their Marathon Concerts, Bang on a Can presented twenty-six hours of uninterrupted music at the World Financial Center Winter Garden Atrium in New York City.

Among Bang on a Can's early events were performances by John Cage, premieres of Glenn Branca’s epic symphonies for massed electric guitars, and fully staged operas by Harry Partch, featuring the composer's original instruments.

Programs

Bang on a Can Summer Festival at MASS MoCA

In 2002, Bang on a Can began the yearly Summer Institute of Music, a program at the Massachusetts Museum of Contemporary Art (MASS MoCA) for young composers and performers. This program is sometimes referred to by the nickname "Banglewood" in reference to the nearby but far more traditional Tanglewood Music Festival.

Staged Works
The three artistic directors occasionally collaborate by jointly composing large staged works, often without revealing which sections each contributed.  Examples include:
 The Carbon Copy Building - a "comic book opera" with words and drawings by MacArthur Grant recipient Ben Katchor.  It was the winner of the 2000 Obie Award for Best Production.
 Lost Objects - a contemporary oratorio, with a libretto by Deborah Artman. It is a fusion of baroque music and modern soundscapes, rendered in performance by the original instruments ensemble Concerto Köln with four electronic instruments, three solo vocalists, a choir, and a live remix generated by DJ Spooky.
 The New Yorkers - a staged multimedia concert with additional contributions by filmmakers and visual artists including: Ben Katchor, Bill Morrison, Doug Aitken, and William Wegman.
 Shelter - a multi-media work that, in the words of librettist Deborah Artman, "evokes the power and threat of nature, the soaring frontier promise contained in the framing of a new house, the pure aesthetic beauty of blueprints, the sweet architecture of sound and the uneasy vulnerability that underlies even the safety of our sleep."

People's Commissioning Fund (PCF)
Bang on a Can has commissioned and premiered pieces by composers including Steve Reich, Terry Riley, Michael Nyman, John Adams, Somei Satoh, Iva Bittová, Roberto Carnevale, Ornette Coleman, Donnacha Dennehy and Bun-Ching Lam. In 1998 the organization began the People's Commissioning Fund, which supports the creation of new musical compositions by pooling contributions from numerous member-commissioners whose donations range from $5 to $5,000.

List of PCF commissioned composers
1998 Virgil Moorefield, Pamela Z, Dan Plonsey
2000 Marc Mellits, Edward Ruchalski, Miya Masaoka, Toby Twining
2001 Jeffrey Brooks, Sussan Deyhim, James Fei, Keeril Makan
2002 Eve Beglarian, John King, Matthew Shipp
2003 Annea Lockwood, Ingram Marshall, Thurston Moore
2005 Cynthia Hopkins, Carla Kihlstedt, J.G. Thirlwell
2006 Yoav Gal, Annie Gosfield, John Hollenbeck
2007 Stefan Weisman, Joshua Penman, Lukas Ligeti
2008 Tristan Perich, Erdem Helvacioglu, Ken Thomson
2009 Kate Moore, Lok Yin Tang
 2010 Oscar Bettison, Nik Baertsch, Christine Southworth, Dave Longstreth (of Dirty Projectors)
2011 Bryce Dessner (of The National), Karsh Kale, Nick Brooke
2012 Mira Calix, Florent Ghys, Christian Marclay, Nick Zammuto (of The Books) 
2013 Anna Clyne, Dan Deacon, Jóhann Jóhannsson, Paula Matthusen
2014 Glenn Kotche, Jace Clayton (aka DJ/rupture), Ben Frost
2015 Caroline Shaw, Gabriella Smith, Zhang Shouwang
2016 Anna Thorvaldsdottir, Juan Felipe Waller, Nico Muhly

Bang on a Can All-Stars

The Bang on a Can All-Stars is an amplified sextet formed by its parent organization in 1992. The All-Stars tour internationally and have received awards and public recognition for their work in the contemporary classical music field.
 
The instrumentation of the Bang on a Can All-Stars is clarinet, cello, electric guitar, piano/keyboard, percussion, double bass. Current members include Robert Black, Vicky Chow, David Cossin, Arlen Husklo, Mark Stewart and Ken Thomson.

Asphalt Orchestra
Asphalt Orchestra is Bang on a Can's 12-piece marching band.  The ensemble's premiere performance was in 2009 at the Lincoln Center Out of Doors festival, and featured new commissioned works by Tyondai Braxton (of experimental rock group Battles), Goran Bregovic, and Stew and Heidi Rodewald, alongside arrangements of songs by Björk, Meshuggah, Mingus, Nancarrow, and Zappa.

The New York Times has called Asphalt Orchestra's members "12 top-notch brass and percussion players", and praised their performance as "coolly brilliant and infectious."

Found Sound Nation

An independent project founded in 2009 and produced by Bang on a Can, Found Sound Nation (FSN) engages at-risk youth and underrepresented communities producing original audio and video projects across the globe in economically disparate settings. The work of FSN emphasizes a mobile, accessible, collaborative way of recording and producing professional quality music, a technique developed by combining the art music traditions of Bang on a Can with traditions of musique concrète, hip hop, and contemporary composition.

FSN has led site-specific projects in New York City, India, Zimbabwe, Mexico, Italy, Switzerland and Haiti.

In 2012, the project received an award from the U.S. Department of State to produce OneBeat, an international music exchange which will bring together innovative musicians from around the world to compose, produce and perform original music.

Found Sound Nation was co-founded by Christopher Marianetti and Jeremy Thal. The project is directed by Marianetti, Thal and Elena Moon Park.

Recordings
In the past, Bang on a Can released recordings on Composers Recordings Inc. (CRI), Sony Classical, Point Music (Universal), and Nonesuch, but now the majority of its recordings are found on its own record label, Cantaloupe Music.  In addition to releasing works by Gordon, Wolfe, and Lang, the label releases CDs of music by composers and musical groups affiliated with the organization, including Evan Ziporyn, Phil Kline, Alarm Will Sound, Icebreaker, Ethel, Gutbucket, R. Luke DuBois, and Don Byron among many, many others.

Below is a partial discography of released works performed by Bang on a Can:

Bang on a Can discography

 Bang on a Can Live, volume 1 (1992)
 Bang on a Can Live, volume 2 (1993)
 Bang on a Can Live, volume 3 (1994)
 Industry (1995)
 Cheating, Lying, Stealing (1996)
 Music for Airports (composed by Brian Eno) (1998)
 Renegade Heaven (2001)
 Lost Objects (2001)
 In C (composed by Terry Riley) (2001)
 Bang on a Can Classics (2002)
 Gigantic Dancing Human Machine (music of Louis Andriessen) (2003)
 ShadowBang (composed by Evan Ziporyn) (2003)
 Music in Fifths / Two Pages (composed by Philip Glass) (2004)
 Bang on a Can Meets Kyaw Kyaw Naing (2004)
 Elida (composer and guest musician Iva Bittová) (2005)
 A Ballad for Many (composer and guest musician Don Byron) (2006)
 The Essential Martin Bresnick (2006)
 The Carbon Copy Building (2007)
 Music for Airports (Live) (2008)
 Music from the Film (Untitled) (2009)
 Double Sextet / 2x5 (music of Steve Reich) (2010)
 Big Beautiful Dark and Scary (2012)
 Shelter (Ensemble Signal) (2013)
 Field Recordings (2015)

See also
List of experimental music festivals

References

External links
Bang on a Can official website
Asphalt Orchestra official website
Found Sound Nation official website
Art of the States: Bang on a Can Festival
Art of the States: Bang on a Can All-Stars

Contemporary classical music ensembles
Musical groups established in 1987
Musical groups from New York City
Experimental music festivals